Buli is a village in the Zhemgang district in Bhutan. The village is located in the Nangkor Gewog of Zhemgang District in central Bhutan.

See also
List of cities, towns and villages in Bhutan

External links
Bali on Google Maps

Populated places in Bhutan